James Christopher Harrington (25 December 1896 – 6 May 1978) was an English footballer who played in the Football League for Liverpool, Wigan Borough, Southport and Crewe Alexandra. He later moved to America to play for New York Giants.

References

External links
 LFC History profile

1896 births
1978 deaths
English footballers
Association football forwards
Liverpool F.C. players
English Football League players
South Liverpool F.C. players
Wigan Borough F.C. players
Southport F.C. players
Crewe Alexandra F.C. players
New York Giants (soccer) players
Expatriate soccer players in the United States
English expatriate footballers
English expatriate sportspeople in the United States